Brzeski may refer to the following places in Poland:
Brzeg County (powiat brzeski) in Opole Voivodeship (south-west Poland)
Brzesko County (powiat brzeski) in Lesser Poland Voivodeship (south Poland)
Brzeski, Łódź Voivodeship (central Poland)
Brzeski, Masovian Voivodeship (east-central Poland)